Keely Andrew (born 2 December 1994) is a professional surfer from Australia.

Andrew finished second in the Australian Junior Surfing Titles.

Career Highlights

Sponsors 
Keely Andrew's sponsors have included JR Surfboards, On a Mission, Surfmud, Buell Wetsuits

References 

1994 births
Living people
People from the Sunshine Coast, Queensland
Australian female surfers
World Surf League surfers